Thomas E. Dewey (1902–1971) was Governor of New York.

Thomas Dewey may also refer to:

Thomas Charles Dewey (1840–1926), President of the Prudential Assurance Company
Thomas B. Dewey (1915–1981), American crime novelist
Thomas E. Dewey Jr. (born 1932), son of the governor, investment banker

See also
Dewey (disambiguation)